Bazra-Nattis is a town in west-central Ivory Coast. It is a sub-prefecture of Vavoua Department in Haut-Sassandra Region, Sassandra-Marahoué District.

Bazra-Nattis was a commune until March 2012, when it became one of 1126 communes nationwide that were abolished.

In 2014, the population of the sub-prefecture of Bazra-Nattis was 39,218.

Villages
The 12 villages of the sub-prefecture of Bazra-Nattis and their population in 2014 are:

Notes

Sub-prefectures of Haut-Sassandra
Former communes of Ivory Coast